"Pure Imagination" is a song from the 1971 film Willy Wonka & the Chocolate Factory.

Pure Imagination may also refer to:

Music
 Pure Imagination (Eric Reed album), 1998
 Pure Imagination (Michael Feinstein album), 1992
 Pure Imagination, a 2004–2007 series of compilation albums from Utopia Records
 "Come with Me (Pure Imagination)", a 2016 song by Karmin
 “Pure Imagination”, a 1999 remixed version of the Brenda K. Starr song "I Still Believe"

Other uses
 Pure Imagination (comics), an American comic book, magazine, and book publisher
 "Pure Imagination" (Top Chef Just Desserts), a 2011 TV episode
 Pure Imagination, an ice cave in the Sandy Glacier Caves, Mt. Hood, Oregon

See also
 The Land of Pure Imagination, a 2006 album by Roger Joseph Manning, Jr.
 Imagination (disambiguation)
 Imaginary (disambiguation)
 Imagine (disambiguation)